Kadihat Belbari High School is an Upper Primary with Secondary and Higher Secondary School for Boys only situated at Belbari, Ward No.-3 of Gangarampur Municipality in Dakshin Dinajpur district of West Bengal. It was established in the year 1974 and the school management is Department of Education. It's a Bengali Medium - Co-educational school.

See also
Gangarampur Girls' High School
Gangarampur College

References

External links 
Kadihat Belbari High School

Schools in Dakshin Dinajpur district
High schools and secondary schools in West Bengal
Gangarampur
Educational institutions established in 1974
1974 establishments in West Bengal